Dameron is an unincorporated community in Raleigh County, West Virginia, United States.

The community was named after the local Dameron family.

References 

Unincorporated communities in West Virginia
Unincorporated communities in Raleigh County, West Virginia